Kristijan Ipša (born 4 April 1986) is a Croatian footballer of Slovenian heritage who plays as a central defender. He is a former Croatian youth international.

Club career
Born in Poreč, Ipša started his professional career in the youth ranks of NK Varteks. He became a regular in the Varteks squad in 2004 at just 18 years of age. His stellar defensive play was noticed and in the summer of 2007 he made a move to FC Energie Cottbus, thought to be worth around 500 thousand Euros. In January 2016 he signed half-year contract with Piast Gliwice with option of extending for one more year.

International career
Ipša has represented the youth ranks of the Croatian national team at the U17, U19 and U21 levels, and has been capped a total of 41 times, scoring two goals. He was a regular at the Croatian national under-21 team.

References

External links

1986 births
Living people
People from Poreč
Association football central defenders
Croatian footballers
Croatia youth international footballers
Croatia under-21 international footballers
NK Varaždin players
FC Energie Cottbus players
FC Midtjylland players
Reggina 1914 players
Piast Gliwice players
FC Petrolul Ploiești players
Croatian Football League players
Bundesliga players
Danish Superliga players
Serie B players
Ekstraklasa players
Liga I players
Croatian expatriate footballers
Expatriate footballers in Germany
Croatian expatriate sportspeople in Germany
Expatriate men's footballers in Denmark
Croatian expatriate sportspeople in Denmark
Expatriate footballers in Romania
Croatian expatriate sportspeople in Romania
Expatriate footballers in Poland
Croatian expatriate sportspeople in Poland
Expatriate footballers in Italy
Croatian expatriate sportspeople in Italy